Sunghoon Kwon (born 23 December 1975) a biomedical engineer and an entrepreneur. He is the professor of Electrical and Computer Engineering at Seoul National University in Republic of Korea and the CEO of Quantamatrix.

Education and early life 
Sunghoon Kwon was born on 23 December 1975 in Seoul; he studied at Yeoksam Middle School and Sangmun High School; he studied at the Department of Electrical Engineering at Seoul National University to become a programmer because he was interested in computer programming since he was a child. In the third year of college, he was admitted to the hospital due to a serious traffic accident, and his dream changed to biomedical engineering as he saw electronic and electrical technologies such as Computed Tomography (CT) and Magnetic Resonance Imaging (MRI) play an important role in medicine.
Sunghoon Kwon studied medical devices mainly for doctors at the Department of Medical Engineering at Seoul National University and received a master's degree with the theme of developing a wireless mouse that moves according to eye movements for the disabled. Later, he entered the doctoral program at UC Berkeley, where he studied bio / optical MEMS and lab on a chip system for biomaterial analysis. In 2003, he completed his Ph.D. under the supervision of Luke Pyungse Lee. in three and a half years and studied nanomaterials and nanoprocessing at the Lawrence Berkeley National Laboratory.

Career 

Ever since he was appointed professor of the Department of Electrical and Computer Engineering at Seoul National University, he always wanted to give tools or devices to life scientists and medical doctors that they needed in their cutting edges, to enable innovations. Therefore, for the last 14 years, he and his group have worked towards realization of personalized medicine under the motto: “helping life scientist with technology.” and have made technological breakthroughs in personalized medicine that resulted in 80 scientific literatures, 130 patents and 2 spun-off companies hiring more than 200 full-time employees. He focused on developing technologies for life scientists and medical doctors to improve personalized therapeutics to reduce the breakdown cost for disease treatment.

Kwon's research includes work on multiplex bio assay platform, single cell analysis and algorithm for immune profiling

Awards and honors 

Sunghoon Kwon was invited to deliver a Plenary Talk in IEEE OMN (2020) and delivered invited lectures in prominent international conferences including TEDx talk in Korea Foundation for Advanced Studies (KFAS) (2018), Plenary Talk in IEEE MEMS (the first Korean Plenary Talk in 31 years history of IEEE MEMS conference) (2017) and more plenary talks and invited talks.

He was appointed as one of the eight SNU Creative Distinguished Professors (Similar to University Professorship, $660k) of the Seoul National University in 2012. He gained academic recognition of his excellence from both engineering and science by winning many awards including the Young Scientist Award, The Korea Academy of Science and Technology (2011), Korean Young Scientist Award ($100k) from the Korean President, presidential award given to 4 scientists under age of 40 (2012), IEEK/IEEE Joint Awards IT Young Engineer Award (2016), Young Engineer Award ($44k) from the National Academy of Engineering of Korea (2018) and Jin-Pok Kim’s Award for the Best Cancer Research in Korea from Korea Cancer Research Foundation (2019). Kwon is one of few scientists who has early career awards from both National Science Academy and National Engineering Academy at the same time. He is the first Korean winner of the 13th Pioneers of Miniaturization Lectureship, Lab on a Chip Journal (2018).

Kwon is a member of NAEK, the National Academy of Engineering of Korea (2020) that appoints engineers who make remarkable contributions to the technological development, and a member of Y-KAST, young Korean Academy of Science and Technology (2017) that is given to innovative scientists under 45. Kwon served in many technical program committees in prominent societies, like MicroTAS, IEEE MEMS, and Transducers.

Selected publications 

 Lim, D. K.; Jeon, K. S.; Hwang, J. H.; Kim, H.; Kwon, S.; Suh, Y. D.; & Nam, J. M. (2011). Highly uniform and reproducible surface-enhanced Raman scattering from DNA-tailorable nanoparticles with 1-nm interior gap. Nature nanotechnology, 6(7), 452. doi:https://doi.org/10.1038/nnano.2011.79
 Kim, H.; Ge, J.; Kim, J.; Choi, S. E.; Lee, H.; Lee, H.; Park, W.; Yin, Y.; & Kwon, S. (2009). Structural colour printing using a magnetically tunable and lithographically fixable photonic crystal. Nature Photonics, 3(9), 534-540. doi:https://doi.org/10.1038/nphoton.2009.141
 Chung, S. E.; Park, W.; Shin, S.; Lee, S. A.; & Kwon, S. (2008). Guided and fluidic self-assembly of microstructures using railed microfluidic channels. Nature materials, 7(7), 581-587. doi:https://doi.org/10.1038/nmat2208
 Chan, S.; Kwon, S.; Koo, T. W.; Lee, L. P.; & Berlin, A. A. (2003). Surface‐Enhanced Raman Scattering of Small Molecules from Silver‐Coated Silicon Nanopores. Advanced Materials, 15(19), 1595-1598. doi:https://doi.org/10.1002/adma.200305149
 Lee, H.; Kim, J.; Kim, H.; Kim, J.; & Kwon, S. (2010). Colour-barcoded magnetic microparticles for multiplexed bioassays. Nature materials, 9(9), 745-749. doi:https://doi.org/10.1038/nmat2815
 Kim, J.; Chung, S. E.; Choi, S. E.; Lee, H.; Kim, J.; & Kwon, S. (2011). Programming magnetic anisotropy in polymeric microactuators. Nature materials, 10(10), 747-752. doi:https://doi.org/10.1038/nmat3090
 Ge, J.; Lee, H.; He, L.; Kim, J.; Lu, Z.; Kim, H.; Goebl, J.; Kwon, S.; & Yin, Y. (2009). Magnetochromatic microspheres: rotating photonic crystals. Journal of the American Chemical Society, 131(43), 15687-15694. doi:https://doi.org/10.1021/ja903626h
 Chung, S. E.; Park, W.; Park, H.; Yu, K.; Park, N.; & Kwon, S. (2007). Optofluidic maskless lithography system for real-time synthesis of photopolymerized microstructures in microfluidic channels. Applied Physics Letters, 91(4), 041106. doi:https://doi.org/10.1063/1.2759988
 Choi, J.; Yoo, J.; Lee, M.; Kim, E. G.; Lee, J. S.; Lee, S.; Joo, S.; Song, S. H.; Kim, E.; Lee, J. C.; Kim, H. C.; Jung, Y.; & Kwon, S. (2014). A rapid antimicrobial susceptibility test based on single-cell morphological analysis. Science translational medicine, 6(267), 267ra174-267ra174. doi:10.1126/scitranslmed.3009650
 Bae, H. J.; Bae, S.; Park, C.; Han, S.; Kim, J.; Kim, L. N.; Kim, K.; Song, S.; Park, W.; & Kwon, S. (2015). Biomimetic Microfingerprints for Anti‐Counterfeiting Strategies. Advanced Materials, 27(12), 2083-2089. doi:https://doi.org/10.1002/adma.201405483

External links 

 Biophotonics and Nano Engineering Lab
 Quantamatrix
 Celemics

References 

Biomedical engineers
1975 births
Living people
University of California, Berkeley alumni
Academic staff of Seoul National University
South Korean bioengineers